Abutalipovo (Äbütalip) is a rural locality (a village) in Artakulsky Selsoviet of Karaidelsky District, Bashkortostan, Russia. The population was 261 . There are 7 streets.

Ethnicity 
The village is inhabited by Tatars.

Geography 
Abutalipovo is located 37 km west of Karaidel (the district's administrative centre) by road. Artakul is the nearest rural locality.

References 

Rural localities in Karaidelsky District